In agriculture, disease management is the practice of minimising disease in crops to increase quantity or quality of harvest yield.

Organisms that cause infectious disease in crops include fungi, oomycetes, bacteria, viruses, viroids, virus-like organisms, phytoplasmas, protozoa, nematodes and parasitic plants. Crops can also suffer from ectoparasites including insects, mites, snails, slugs, and vertebrate animals, but these are not considered diseases.

Controlling diseases can be achieved by resistance genes, fungicides, nematicides, quarantine, etc. Disease management can be a large part of farm operating costs.

See also 
 Corn smut
 Great Irish Famine
 blight

References 

Phytopathology